Samson Abioye (25 March 1991 – 28 July 2017) was a Nigerian computer programmer and internet entrepreneur. In 2013, he co-founded pass.ng, a self-testing online platform which helps students practice for national examinations, while studying at Ladoke Akintola University as an undergraduate. Until his death, he operated as pass.ng's CEO.

Career
He worked temporarily with his University's ICT department while studying before co-founding pass.ng which won the Airtel Catapult-a-Startup competition in 2014. He was also the winner of the 2013 National Best Developer for Computer Science students in Nigeria as an undergraduate.

Death
Abioye passed on in the morning of 28 July 2017. Pulse Nigeria described his death as "one that has shocked the sphere of technology in Nigeria".

References

1991 births
2017 deaths
Nigerian business executives
Yoruba businesspeople
Nigerian technology businesspeople
Nigerian computer programmers
Ladoke Akintola University of Technology alumni